Superiority complex is a term coined by Alfred Adler (1870-1937) in the early 1900s, as part of his school of individual psychology.

A superiority complex is a defense mechanism that develops over time to help a person cope with feelings of inferiority. Individuals with this complex typically come across as supercilious, haughty, and disdainful toward others. They may treat others in an imperious, overbearing, and even aggressive manner.

In everyday usage, the term "superiority complex" is used to refer to an overly high opinion of oneself.

Alfred Adler

Alfred Adler was the first to use the term superiority complex. He claimed that a superiority complex essentially came from the need to overcome underlying feelings of inferiority: an inferiority complex. Throughout his works Adler intertwines the occurrence of an inferiority complex and a superiority complex as cause and effect. Among his writings touching on the topic were Understanding Human Nature (1927), and Superiority and Social Interest: A Collection of Later Writings, a collection of twenty-one papers written by Adler and published posthumously in 1964.

Adler distinguished a normal striving to achieve from superiority complexes, the latter being attempts in order to overcompensate a feeling of inferiority. He states that those with an inferiority complex develop a superiority complex to overcome the difficulties presented by the former, primarily by inflating their sense of self-importance in some way. Dreams of heroism, and a false assumption of success, revealed for Adler the reactive nature of such strivings.  

While Adler considered what he refers to in his writing as striving for superiority was a universal of human nature, he thought sound-minded individuals do not strive for personal superiority over others, rather for personal ambition and success through work.  By contrast, those with an actual superiority complex were riddled with conceited fantasies, and with dreams of immutable supremacy.

Other interpretations 
In contrast, an edition of the Diagnostic and Statistical Manual of Mental Disorders that was published about twenty years after Alfred Adler's works disagreed that superiority complex (under the formal name of grandiose delusion in the DSM IV) came solely from the effects of an inferiority complex. The DSM IV states that a second cause to this delusional disorder could stem from an exaggerated emotional state.

Ada Kahn has argued that the superiority and inferiority complexes cannot both be found in the same individual, since an individual with a superiority complex truly believes that they are superior to others. She claimed that - whereas an inferiority complex may manifest with the behaviors that are intended to show others that one is superior, such as expensive material possessions, or an obsession with vanity and appearances to conceal feelings of inadequacy - superiority complex sufferers do not always care about image or vanity, since they have innate feelings of superiority, and thus do not usually concern themselves with proving their superiority to others.

Vera Hoorens say that those exhibiting the superiority complex have a self-image of supremacy. Whereas individuals with an inferiority complex tend to present themselves in the best light possible, those with a superiority complex may not even attempt to make themselves look good, or to express their superiority to others. They may speak as if they are all-knowing and better than others, but ultimately do not care if others think so or not, much like with the cognitive bias known as illusory superiority. Accordingly, they may be viewed in a negative light by those around them, since they are not concerned with the opinions of others about themselves.  Other people may not distinguish between those with low self-opinion who care deeply about the opinion of others, and those with the actual complex, who feel superior and with high self-esteem, and do not care at all about the opinion of others.

Cultural examples

Beethoven's nobility pretence was the result of a superiority complex; but it was the same complex that fuelled his extraordinary musical achievements. As Ernst Bloch said of the young musician's boastful claims, "This piece of presumption was needed to enable him to become Beethoven".

See also

References 

Adlerian psychology
Complex (psychology)
Narcissism
Mental states